Spencer Johnson (born April 10, 1991) is an American soccer player.

Career

College and amateur
Johnson played four years of college soccer at Cal State Fullerton between 2010 and 2014, including a red-shirted year in 2011.

Professional
Johnson signed with United Soccer League side Arizona United on March 28, 2015.

References 

1991 births
Living people
American soccer players
Cal State Fullerton Titans men's soccer players
Phoenix Rising FC players
USL Championship players
Soccer players from California
People from Rolling Hills, California
Association football midfielders